The Roman Catholic Diocese of Gracias (Latin: Dioecesis Gratiensis) is a diocese of the Roman Catholic Church in Honduras.

History 
It was erected on 27 April 2021 with its territory having been  carved from the Diocese of Santa Rosa de Copán. The diocese was a suffragan of the Archdiocese of Tegucigalpa until 2023, when it was transferred to the newly erected province of San Pedro Sula, and covers 21 parishes with 500,000 Catholics.

Ordinaries 
 Walter Guillén Soto, SDB: (27 Apr 2021 Appointed - present)

See also 
 List of Catholic dioceses in Honduras

References 

Gracias
Gracias
Roman Catholic Ecclesiastical Province of Tegucigalpa
Christian organizations established in 2021